Shrapnel is a supervillain appearing in media published by DC Comics, primarily as an enemy of the Outsiders and the Doom Patrol.

Shrapnel has appeared in Batman: The Brave and the Bold and season two of Arrow, portrayed by Sean Maher in the latter.

Publication history
Shrapnel first appeared in Doom Patrol vol. 2, #7 and was created by Paul Kupperberg and Erik Larsen.

Fictional character biography
Very little about Shrapnel's past and identity is known, although it is known that his name is Mark Scheffer and that he was a normal human at one time and has an ex-wife and two very human blond-haired daughters. Shrapnel has tried to stay incognito, but failed to do so after deciding to slaughter anyone who caught even a glimpse of him.

He was discovered by the Doom Patrol in Kansas while on a murder spree and forced into combat by the team. Celsius quickly flooded Shrapnel encasing him within a solid prison block of ice. Shrapnel blew it apart, hitting Mrs. Caulder point blank and hospitalizing the heroine.

It is also noted that Rhea Jones was not able to magnetize any control over Shrapnel. It was energy blasting Tempest who worked out that Shrapnel is a series of organic cells creating a single consciousness - that feeds on the blood of victims.
Shrapnel escaped the encounter with the Doom Patrol.

He has since joined the Society. Shrapnel has later resurfaced as one of the exiled supervillains in Salvation Run.

In the DC Special: Cyborg mini-series, Shrapnel has joined the Cyborg Revenge Squad.

Following the Final Crisis, he was with Cheetah III's Secret Society of Super-Villains at the time when Genocide was created. He was defeated by Wonder Woman.

Shrapnel appeared in the inter-company crossover JLA/Avengers as one of the villains who attack the Vision and Aquaman in Metropolis. He actually makes the first attack, but the Vision blocks it by increasing his density. After the two heroes are subdued, Shrapnel prepares to blast Aquaman when Green Lantern attacks him and knocks him out.

Powers and abilities
As a being made of organic metal, Shrapnel has superhuman strength and stamina. He does not have to eat or sleep in this form.

In addition, the metal plates on Shrapnel's body can be projected into explosive bursts. Each scale is a living organism controlled by Shrapnel's consciousness, so once fired they can be directed and recalled at will. Pieces lost by Shrapnel will eventually die, but he can regenerate new ones.

In other media
 An amalgamated incarnation of Shrapnel, with elements of and named after General Kafka (a foe from Jack Kirby's OMAC comic), appears in the Batman: The Brave and the Bold episode "When OMAC Attacks!", voiced by Greg Ellis. This version is a Russian war criminal who claims to have hailed from a poor Russian village that was razed during an unspecified conflict, which doomed the survivors to poverty and famine, and seeks revenge for this. He is unknowingly manipulated by Equinox into fighting OMAC and attempting to cause a meltdown in New York City, during which he is transformed into an organic metal being with the ability to metabolize any form of physical assault used against him to empower himself amidst a lab accident. With Batman's help, OMAC ends the battle by raising his shield and tricking Shrapnel into tiring himself out.
 Mark "Shrapnel" Scheffer appears in Arrow, portrayed by Sean Maher. Introduced in the episode "Blast Radius", this version is a non-metahuman anti-government serial bomber and member of a terrorist militia group. After bombing two government buildings in Starling City, Scheffer targets Sebastian Blood's Unity Rally, but is thwarted and captured by the Arrow. In the episode "Suicide Squad", Scheffer becomes a reluctant member of the titular team. While attempting to abandon them on their first mission, he is killed by Amanda Waller via a nano-bomb implanted in the squad members' heads to keep them in line.

References

External links
 Rapsheet: Shrapnel

Comics characters introduced in 1988
Doom Patrol
DC Comics supervillains
DC Comics male supervillains
DC Comics characters with accelerated healing
DC Comics characters with superhuman strength
DC Comics metahumans
Fictional terrorists
Characters created by Erik Larsen
Suicide Squad members
Fictional Russian people
Fictional generals